The third Galan government, led by president Giancarlo Galan, was the government of Veneto from 19 May 2005 to 19 April 2010.

References

Governments of Veneto
2005 establishments in Italy
2010 disestablishments in Italy